National Accord is a Greek political movement, initially founded in 2022 as a think tank after Constantinos Bogdanos was ousted for the New Democracy party, it later on became a political party due to its leader leaving the National Creation Alliance.

References 

Political parties in Greece